HMS Monkey was a schooner of the British Royal Navy assigned to the West Indies squadron, launched in 1826 at Jamaica. She made three notable captures of slavers, one involving a single-ship action against a slaver much larger and more heavily armed than herself. She was wrecked in 1831 near Tampico.

Origins
There was a third vessel, Nimble, that the Navy found defective and refused to accept.

Career
Lieutenant Edward Holland commissioned Monkey on 26 July 1826, for Jamaica. In July 1827, Lieutenant James Beckford Lewis Hay replaced Holland. Lieutenant Martin Cole was appointed to replace Hay on 20 September 1828, but in October Lieutenant Joseph Sherer assumed command.

On 8 December Monkey landed a detachment of the 2nd West India Regiment, under the command of Captain Thomas McPherson, on Exuma. The troops' arrival calmed unrest among slaves on a plantation there.

On 14 March 1829 Monkey, under the command of Lieutenant Joseph Sherer, captured the American vessel Borneo.

On 7 April 1829 Monkey captured the Spanish schooner Josefa, in among the Bahamas, near the Berry Islands or Rocks. She was armed with one 12-pounder gun, had a crew of 21, and was carrying 206 slaves; 79 men, 36 women, 48 boys and 43 girls. After Josefas capture one female child was born, and one woman died. Head money for 206 slaves was paid in February 1831.

The 360-ton Midas, alias Providencia, was under the command of Captain Ildefonso Martinez. Midas, which mounted four long 18-pounder and four medium 12-pounder guns and had a crew of more than 50, was taken in an action lasting 35 minutes. One or more of her crew and of the slaves on board were killed and others wounded in the battle.

 helped Monkey escort Midas to port. Midas had left Africa in April 1829 with 562 Africans, but only 369  were still alive when she was captured, and 72 more died of "smallpox, diarrhea & scurvy" before Monkey and Nimble could take Midas into Havana. Lieutenant Sherer discovered that Midass crew included two Americans (one severely wounded by grapeshot in the capture), and five British subjects, including one "a free Black of Jamaica". Head money for 400 slaves was paid in February 1831.

Sherer received promotion to the rank of Commander on 30 December 1829 for his successes.

In 1830 Monkey was briefly under the command of Lieutenant Willoughby Shortland.

Loss
Monkey was under the command of Mate Thomas Downes when she wrecked on 13 May 1831 near Tampico, Mexico. A local steam boat was towing her across the bar at Tampico but only succeeded in running her aground. Supposedly she was beaten to a wreck and her remains sold at auction on 25 May. Still, her crew were rescued.

The Royal Navy replaced her in October with a second .

Notes, citations, and references
Notes

Citations

References
 
 
 
 
 
 
 

1826 ships
Schooners of the Royal Navy
African slave trade
Maritime incidents in May 1831